Allen Chandler (born 5 December 1849 in Kensington, London, died 25 December 1926 in Haslemere, Surrey) was a batsman for Surrey in the 1870s.

Chandler played 29 first-class matches between 1873 and 1877, scoring a total of 716 runs. He recorded his highest score of 74 against Cambridge University at The Oval in 1875. He captained the Surrey team during the 1876 season.

References
CricketArchive page on Allen Chandler

1849 births
1926 deaths
English cricketers
Surrey cricketers
Surrey cricket captains
People educated at Cheltenham College
Surrey Club cricketers
Gentlemen of the South cricketers
Sportspeople from Gloucestershire